Jackie Beat (born July 24, 1963) is the drag persona of actor, singer, songwriter and screenwriter Kent Fuher. Beat has appeared in a number of independent feature films both in and out of drag, including Wigstock: The Movie, Flawless, and Adam & Steve (for which he also wrote and performed the song "Dance Off"). In television, Beat has appeared on Sex and the City and was a writer for the short-lived sketch comedy series Hype on The WB Television Network.

Beat was a fixture on the New York City cabaret scene and performs sold-out Gay Pride and Christmas runs every year. She has performed at clubs such as Martinis Above Fourth in San Diego, CA; Executive Suite in Long Beach,  CA; Hamburger Mary's in West Hollywood; Cavern Club in Silver Lake; Badlands in Sacramento, CA; Re-bar and Julia's Restaurant in Seattle, WA; and the Laurie Beechman Theatre in New York City. She has also appeared at Bob's Comedy Funhouse in Cardiff, Sheffield, Nottingham, Manchester, and London; 170 Russell in Melbourne, Australia; FAMILY in Brisbane, Australia, and numerous other venues.

In 2015, Beat was the host of Seattle Pride’s Pride Parade.

In March of 2019, Beat appeared as Bea Arthur at an event called The MisMatch Game, hosted by Dennis Hensley, for the Los Angeles LGBT Center's 15th Anniversary celebration. Beat frequently performs as both Arthur and her Golden Girls character Dorothy Zbornak, notably in the parody theater show The Golden Gurlz.

Beat has been profiled by major news outlets such as The Los Angeles Times, The Huffington Post, LA Weekly, and The New York Times.

Early life

Beat was born Kent Fuher on July 24, 1963 to Jack and Liliana Fuher. She debuted her drag persona at Los Angeles's Café Largo in the late 1980s.

Music

Beat is the lead singer of the Electroclash band Dirty Sanchez. She has also released 7 albums as a solo artist, primarily R-rated parodies of mainstream songs.

Personal life

Beat lived in the Highland Park neighborhood of Los Angeles for many years. She sold her home there in 2016 and currently resides in Altadena, California. She is a vocal supporter of President Barack Obama and a harsh critic of figures such as Donald Trump and former presidential hopeful Sarah Palin.

Filmography

Film

Television

Video Games

(* - though the character shared Beat's real life name, she portrayed a fictional character similar to herself)

Podcasts

References

External links

 
 
 

Living people
American drag queens
Place of birth missing (living people)
American television writers
American male television writers
1965 births
American male film actors
American male television actors
20th-century American male actors
21st-century American male actors
Male actors from Los Angeles